Lerista frosti is a smaller lizard species found in highlands of central Australia. The common name for the species is centralian slider.

Taxonomy 
A description of the species was presented to the Royal Society of Victoria in 1895 by Arthur H. S. Lucas and Charles Frost, proposing the name Rhodona tetradactyla, The taxon was reassigned to the genus Lygosoma  by Frederick Robert Zietz, and as the earlier binomial was preoccupied (as a synonym for Mocoa tetradactyla) he named the species after Frost.

The taxonomic description is historically uncertain, having been associated with a poorly resolved species group, and was revised to separate new species in 1985, newly named as Lerista flammicauda and Lerista chalybura in the northwest of Australia and Lerista dorsalis found in a southern distribution range.

Description 
A species of Lerista, distinguished by a small and slight form, eyelids that are movable and a less distinct dark stripe at the midline of each side. The overall coloration is olive grey to brown at the upperside, perhaps displaying greenish or red-brown tones, and with two or four rows of dark dot markings extending along the back. The dark pattern begins near the ear and ends along the tail, sometimes displaying light dot or dash marks. The limbs are functional, although the forelimbs are short at than 6 millimetres. and each bear four digits. The tail of  L. frosti is reddish brown and the dark mid-line pattern from the ear becomes less well defined.

The measured range of the snout to vent length is 36 to 60 millimetres, giving an average of 47 mm.
The coloration of this species has a close resemblance to another species of the genus, L. orientalis.

Distribution and habitat 
The known distribution range is around the McDonnell Ranges, usually at sandy plains adjacent to refuge under rocks or vegetation.

References
Notes

Bibliography

Lerista
Skinks of Australia
Reptiles of the Northern Territory
Endemic fauna of Australia
Reptiles described in 1920
Taxa named by Frederick Robert Zietz